Oleksandr Romanchuk may refer to:
 Oleksandr Romanchuk (footballer, born 1984)
 Oleksandr Romanchuk (footballer, born 1999)